System of a Down is the debut studio album by American heavy metal band System of a Down, released on June 30, 1998, by American Recordings and Columbia Records. The album was certified Gold by the Recording Industry Association of America in February 2000. After the success of the band's following album, Toxicity (2001), System of a Down was certified platinum.

Composition

The album is generally considered nu metal and alternative metal, both of which would become staples for the band. Lyrical themes throughout the album vary, with many songs following a theme of being anti-war, but also has topics of genocide, religion, and brainwashing. "Suite-Pee" is a criticism of pedophilia within the Church and religious extremism. "Soil" is, according to guitarist Daron Malakian at a Lowlands show, "about death, and friends that die, and life that dies". "Mind" talks about government mind control, specifically mentioning CIA brainwashing in the album's liner notes. "P.L.U.C.K." is a song dedicated to the victims of the Armenian genocide, and is meant to be a criticism and denouncing of the Turkish Government.

Artwork
The cover artwork is from a 1928 anti-fascist poster designed by visual artist John Heartfield for the Communist Party of Germany. The text on the original poster is: "A hand has 5 fingers! With these 5 grab the enemy!" This slogan inspired part of the text contained on the back of the album: "The hand has five fingers, capable and powerful, with the ability to destroy as well as create". Later, it is written in bold letters: "Open your eyes, open your mouths, close your hands and make a fist" (used later by Serj Tankian in the song "Uneducated Democracy").

Reception

System of a Down received acclaim from music critics. Q called it "an excellent starting point for this most curious band".

The album is featured in the book 1001 Albums You Must Hear Before You Die. Loudwire included the album in its list of The Best Metal Debut Albums, at number 22.

Track listing

Original release
All lyrics written by Serj Tankian, except where noted. All music written by Daron Malakian, except where noted.

Limited edition bonus CD

An early version of "X" from Toxicity was originally recorded for this album. The songs "Honey" and "Temper" from Demo Tape 2 were also recorded for this album but ultimately did not make the cut. The re-recorded versions of these songs have yet to surface anywhere.

Personnel

System of a Down
 Serj Tankian – vocals, keyboards, samples
 Daron Malakian – guitars, vocals
 Shavo Odadjian – bass
 John Dolmayan – drums

Production
 Produced by Rick Rubin with System of a Down
 Mixed by D. Sardy
 Engineered by Sylvia Massy
 Engineer/assistant engineer: Greg Fidelman
 Additional recording/finishing Touches: D. Sardy
 Assistant engineers: Sam Storey, Nick Raskulinecz
 Assistant mixdown engineers: James Saez, Greg Gordon, Andy Haller
 Second assistant mixdown engineer: Bryan Davis
 Extra piano by Rick Rubin
 Photography: Anthony Artiaga
 Cover art: John Heartfield
 Art direction: Frank Harkins & System of a Down
 A&R direction: Dino Paredes, Sam Wick
 Management: Velvet Hammer Management, David Benveniste
 Recorded at Sound City, Van Nuys, California
 Vocals and additional recordings at Akademie Mathematique of Philosophical Sound Research, Hollywood, California
 Mixed at Record Plant Studios, Hollywood, California & Hollywood Sound, California
 Mastered by Vlado Meller at Sony Studios, New York City

Charts and certifications

Weekly charts

Year-end charts

Sales and certifications

References

External links

1998 debut albums
Albums produced by Rick Rubin
American Recordings (record label) albums
Columbia Records albums
System of a Down albums
Albums produced by Daron Malakian
Albums recorded at Sound City Studios